T H Abdul Jabbar (born  28 May 1960) is the president of Vazhakkulam Panchayath in Ernakulam District and a leader of Indian National Congress. Abdul Jabbar is the brother of former Kerala food minister T H Musthafa. Abdul Jabbar born in Thottathil House, Marampilly, Perumbavoor. He has completed his schooling from Govt. Boys HSS, Perumbavoor. He has completed his graduation from St.Pauls College, Kalamassery, Kerala and post graduation in Economics from Dr. Ambedkar Law College, Wadala, Maharashtra. Abdul Jabbar married Sabeena Jabbar in 1985 and has three children. Elder son Hyder Shehin Sha is currently running his own business ZAMORIN-GAMA and younger son is doing 2nd year emergency medicine at Baby memorial hospital Calicut. One and only daughter has completed MA, English literature.

References

1960 births
Living people
Indian National Congress politicians from Kerala
People from Ernakulam district